Agnyphantes is a genus of dwarf spiders that was first described by J. E. Hull in 1932.  it contains only two species: A. arboreus and A. expunctus.

See also
 List of Linyphiidae species

References

Araneomorphae genera
Linyphiidae
Palearctic spiders
Spiders of North America